Kay Goebel is a counseling psychologist in Oklahoma City. Goebel previously served as president of the Arts Council of Oklahoma City and later served six years on the Oklahoma Arts Council, four of those years serving as chair. Goebel was inducted into the Oklahoma Women's Hall of Fame in 1997 among many other awards and honors over the course of her career.

Early life
Goebel was born in Glendive, Montana and grew up on her parents' wheat and cattle ranch, where she developed a love of horseback riding. When she was 11 years old, Goebel and her family moved to Boise, Idaho where her mother's family lived. Goebel attended a very small high school with a graduating class of 17. After high school, Goebel attended a junior college that later became Boise State University. She transferred to and earned her first degree in food and nutrition from Oregon State University.

Goebel married her late husband, Harry, in 1951. He was in the oil business and the young couple moved around a lot early in their marriage. During the first seven years of their marriage, they had five children and eventually moved south in the mid-1950s. In 1967, the family moved to Oklahoma City where they have lived ever since. Goebel went on to earn her master's degree in teaching and teaching certificate from Oklahoma City University. She got a job teaching at the school of her youngest son. Goebel soon after earned her PhD in counseling psychology from the University of Oklahoma.

Career
In January 1972, Goebel went into private practice and has done that ever since.

Community involvement
Goebel began her volunteer work with the Arts Council by selling popcorn at the Arts Festival and began to work her way up the Festival chain. She eventually became a board member and later served on the executive committee of the Arts Council. Former governor David Walters appointed Goebel to the State Arts Council. After about a year, Goebel became President of the Board, or Chairman of that Council, where she served for four years. 
Other ways in which Goebel has served her community include serving on:
Mid-America Arts Alliance Board of Directors
Oklahoma Academy Board of Directors
Girl Scouts of Western Oklahoma Board of Directors
Oklahoma Arts Institute Board of Directors
Allied Arts
Calm Waters Center for Children and Families Board of Directors

Awards and honors
Goebel has been honored with many awards for her work in Oklahoma City. Some of these awards and honors include:
Volunteer Fundraiser of the Year by the Association of Professional Fundraisers (2005)
Key Contributor Award from The Oklahoma Academy (2004)
Planned Parenthood of Central Oklahoma Outstanding Board Service Award (2002)
Name one of the Twenty Most Influential Women in Oklahoma by Oklahoma Family Magazine (2001)
Governor's Arts Award (1996)
Inducted into the Oklahoma Women's Hall of Fame (1997)

References

External links
Oklahoma Women's Hall of Fame Oral History Project -- OSU Library
The Journal Record - Woman of the Year (2006)
"Co-Chairmen Eagerly Await Arts Festival" - The Oklahoman
"Arts Festival Canceled In Wake of Explosion" - The Oklahoman

American women psychologists
21st-century American psychologists
1929 births
Living people
People from Glendive, Montana
Oregon State University alumni
University of Oklahoma alumni
21st-century American women
20th-century American psychologists